In the 2016–17 season, NA Hussein Dey competed in the Ligue 1 for the 41st season, as well as the Algerian Cup.

Pre-season

Mid-season

Overview

Ligue 1

League table

Results summary

Results by round

Matches

Algerian Cup

Squad information

Playing statistics

|-
! colspan=14 style=background:#dcdcdc; text-align:center| Goalkeepers

|-
! colspan=14 style=background:#dcdcdc; text-align:center| Defenders

|-
! colspan=14 style=background:#dcdcdc; text-align:center| Midfielders

|-
! colspan=14 style=background:#dcdcdc; text-align:center| Forwards

|-
! colspan=14 style=background:#dcdcdc; text-align:center| Players transferred out during the season

Goalscorers

Squad list
As of 15 January 2017:

Transfers

In

Out

Notes

References

2016-17
NA Hussein Dey